Koura Kaba Fantoni (born 28 August 1984) is an Italian former sprinter.

Biography
Born in Democratic Republic of the Congo, he lived in Turin from the age of three.

Achievements

National titles
Koura Kaba Fantoni has won the Italian Athletics Championships two times in sprint.
1 win in  100 metres (2007)
1 win in  200 metres (2005)

See also
 Italy national relay team

References

External links
 

1984 births
Italian male sprinters
Living people
Athletics competitors of Fiamme Gialle
Naturalised citizens of Italy
World Athletics Championships athletes for Italy
Italian Athletics Championships winners